Adriana Crispo (d. after 1537), was a noblewoman of the Crispo family, lady of Ios, Therasia (1508-1537) and Antiparos (1528-1537) in the Cyclades. She was one of the last rulers before the conquest of the Ottoman Empire.

Life
She succeeded her father Marco, great-grandson of Francesco I Crispo, as lady of Ios and Therasia. She married Alvise Pisani, a Venetian noble, in 1508.

In 1528 she succeeded her grandmother, Lucrezia Loredano (1446–1528) in Antiparos.

The islands were conquered by the Osman Turks in 1537.

References 
 BJ Slot, Archipelagus turbatus p 38

Year of birth missing
Adriana
16th-century women rulers
16th-century Greek people
16th-century Greek women